The 1915 North Tipperary by-election was held on 17 June 1915.  The by-election was held due to the death of the incumbent Irish Parliamentary MP, John Joseph Esmonde.  It was won by his son, one of the Irish Parliamentary candidates, John Esmonde.

References

1915 elections in Ireland
1915 elections in the United Kingdom
By-elections to the Parliament of the United Kingdom in County Tipperary constituencies
June 1915 events